The fifth season of the British-American animated television sitcom The Amazing World of Gumball, created by Ben Bocquelet, aired on Cartoon Network in the United States on September 1, 2016, and was produced by Cartoon Network Development Studio Europe. The series focuses on the misadventures of Gumball Watterson, a blue 12-year-old cat, along with his adopted brother, Darwin, a goldfish. Together, they cause mischief among their family, as well as with the wide array of students at Elmore Junior High, where they attend middle school.

Development

Plot 
The season focuses on the misadventures of Gumball Watterson, a blue 12-year-old cat, along with his adopted brother, Darwin, a goldfish. Together, they cause mischief among their family, as well as with the wide array of students at Elmore Junior High, where they attend middle school. In a behind-the-scenes video documenting the production of the second season, creator Ben Bocquelet expanded on the development of some of the characters, and how they are based on interactions from his childhood.

Production 
The fifth season began filming on March 3, 2016 and ended filming on May 12, 2017. On June 2, 2014, Cartoon Network announced that the series had been renewed a fourth and fifth season. Both seasons combined will consist of 40 half-hour episodes.

The writers for this season were Nathan Auerbach, Daniel Berg, Ben Bocquelet, Joe Parham, Tobi Wilson, Andrew Jones, Ciaran Murtagh, Joe Markham, John Sheerman, Louise Coats,  James Hamilton, James Huntrods, Jessica Ransom, Jon Foster, James Lamont, Brydie Lee-Kennedy, Simon Landrein, Timothy Mills, Tom Neenan, Jon Purkis, Jack Bernhardt, Bec Hill, Jonny Leigh-Wright, Joseph Pelling, and Becky Sloan. The storyboard artists for the season were Adrian Maganza, Aurelie Charbonnier Wandrille Maunoury, Cedric Guarneri, Oliver Hamilton, Richard Méril, Yani Ouabdesselam, Bianca Ansems, Kenneth Ladekjaer, and Chloé Nicolay. At the end of this episode, "The Copycats", Gumball and Darwin again received new voice actors due to the previous ones hitting puberty: Jacob Hopkins was replaced by Nicolas Cantu (as Gumball) and Terrell Ransom, Jr. was replaced by Donielle Hansley, Jr. (as Darwin), though the episode "The Ollie" leaked online and on most cable OnDemand programs in December, complete with end credits that reveal that the episode was made after Hopkins and Ransom were replaced.

This season had an average of 0.998 million viewers per episode.

Crossovers 
Characters from Clarence, Regular Show and Uncle Grandpa make cameo appearances in the episode, "The Boredom".

Episodes

References

5
2016 American television seasons
2016 British television seasons
2017 American television seasons
2017 British television seasons